Carne pinchada (translation: stabbed meat) is a Nicaraguan dish consisting of meat (such as beef or chicken) marinated in an alcohol sauce, using beer (Tona or Victoria), wine, etc. It is usually served on a stick.

See also
 List of meat dishes
 Nicaraguan cuisine

References

Nicaraguan cuisine
Meat dishes
Skewered foods